The Calpak Plant No. 11 in Sacramento, California, is a building built in 1925. Calpak (later renamed "Del Monte Foods") constructed the building as a fruit cannery but it is now used by Blue Diamond Almonds  It was listed on the National Register of Historic Places in 1984.

See also
 History of Sacramento Cannery Industry
 List of canneries

References

Industrial buildings completed in 1925
Industrial buildings and structures on the National Register of Historic Places in California
Buildings and structures in Sacramento, California
Del Monte Foods
Canneries
Almond production
National Register of Historic Places in Sacramento, California